Crossing the Water is a 1971 posthumous collection of poetry by Sylvia Plath that was prepared for publication by Ted Hughes. These are transitional poems that were written along with the poems that appear in her poetic opus, Ariel. The collection was published in the United Kingdom by Faber & Faber (1975) and in the United States by Harper & Row (1976).

The poems here, mostly written between 1960 and 1961, tend to dwell on one's state of being in an environment. "Wuthering Heights," for example, details a walk that Plath takes along the Yorkshire moors where Emily Brontë once trekked, Finisterre is a stormy island where Plath and her family once visited and "Among the Narcissi" describes Plath's similarities at being among asexual vegetation.

Contents
 Wuthering Heights
 Pheasant
 Crossing the Water
 Finisterre
 Face Lift
 Parliament Hill Fields
 Insomniac
 An Appearance
 Blackberrying
I Am Vertical
 The Babysitters
 In Plaster
 Leaving Early
 Stillborn
 Private Ground
 Heavy Woman
 Widow
 Magi
 Candles
 Event
 Love Letter
 Small Hours
 Sleep in the Mojave Desert
 The Surgeon at 2 a.m.
 Two Campers In Cloud Country
 Mirror
 A Life
 On Deck
 Apprehensions
 Zoo Keeper's Wife
 Whitsun
 The Tour
 Last Words
 Among the Narcissi

Books by Sylvia Plath
1971 poetry books
Books published posthumously
American poetry collections